John Craufurd may refer to:
 John Craufurd (British Army officer) (c. 1725–1764), member of parliament for Berwick-upon-Tweed

See also
 John Crawford (disambiguation)
 John Crawfurd, Scottish physician, colonial administrator, diplomat, and author